Across to Singapore is a 1928 American silent romantic drama film directed by William Nigh, and starring Ramon Novarro, Joan Crawford and Ernest Torrence. The plot involves a love triangle between a woman and two brothers, set on board ship and in Singapore.  The screenplay was written by Ted Shane based on the novel All the Brothers Were Valiant by Ben Ames Williams.

This was the second film based on this novel; the first was All the Brothers Were Valiant (1923, now lost), and it was remade again in 1953 as All the Brothers Were Valiant.

Plot
In 1857, Joel Shore (Ramon Novarro), the carefree youngest son of a seafaring family, has a flirtatious friendship with Priscilla Crowninshield (Joan Crawford), and he eventually falls in love with her.  However, unbeknownst to him, Priscilla has been betrothed to Joel's much older brother, Mark (Ernest Torrence). The wedding is announced in church as a surprise, and Joel and Priscilla are both shocked, with Priscilla refusing to kiss Mark after the betrothal ceremony.

Mark, a ship's captain, sails to Singapore, accompanied by Joel and their other brothers. Priscilla tells Joel she had no idea about the marriage and tries to kiss him, but Joel is hurt and rebuffs Priscilla's advances before he leaves.  At the same time, Mark, mad about Priscilla spurning him, drinks heavily during the voyage and begins to see hallucinations of Priscilla. He senses that Priscilla loves someone else and threatens to harm whoever it is, but Joel tells him she does not love anyone but Mark. Mark continues to drink once they arrive in Singapore, but a conspiratorial crew led by Finch (Jim Mason) sails from Singapore without him, with Mark killed in a bar fight. Joel is put in handcuffs for allegedly not coming to his brother's aid during the fight.

Reaching home, Joel is freed; he finds Priscilla, and, taking her with him, he returns to Singapore for Mark, as he does not believe Mark is dead. They arrive in Singapore six months after having left, and find Mark a drunken mess. Mark sees that Priscilla does not love him, and he steps aside for his brother.

Cast
 Ramon Novarro as Joel Shore
 Joan Crawford as Priscilla Crowninshield
 Ernest Torrence as Captain Mark Shore
 Frank Currier as Jeremiah Shore
 Dan Wolheim as Noah Shore
 Duke Martin as Matthew Shore 
 Edward Connelly as Joshua Crowninshield
 James Mason as Ship's Mate Finch
 Anna May Wong as Singapore Woman

References

External links
 
 
 
 
 Across to 'Singapore' at malayablackandwhite

1920s adventure drama films
American adventure drama films
American romantic drama films
American silent feature films
American black-and-white films
Films based on American novels
Films directed by William Nigh
Metro-Goldwyn-Mayer films
Films set in Singapore
Films set in the 1850s
Seafaring films
1928 films
1928 romantic drama films
1920s American films
Silent romantic drama films
Silent adventure films
Silent American drama films